Anthony Barras (born 29 March 1971) is an English former professional footballer who played as a centre-back in the Football League for Hartlepool United, Stockport County, Rotherham United, York City, Reading, Walsall, Plymouth Argyle, Notts County and Macclesfield Town.

Early life and career
Barras was born in Billingham, County Durham. He started his career with the Hartlepool United youth system, before signing a professional contract in July 1989. He played for York City when they beat Manchester United 3–0 at Old Trafford in the League Cup in September 1995, scoring the third goal after a brace from Paul Barnes.

Barras left York in March 1999 to join Reading. However, in the summer of 1999 he was on the move again, this time to Walsall. Over the next four seasons he made 108 league appearances for the club, and had a brief loan spell at Plymouth Argyle. In the summer of 2003 Barras signed for Notts County. A highlight at Notts County was scoring an equaliser in a League Cup tie against Chelsea at Stamford Bridge, though County went on to lose 4–2. After one season at Notts County he joined Macclesfield Town, where he scored once in the league against Shrewsbury Town and once in a Football League Trophy tie against Mansfield Town.

He signed for North West Counties League Premier Division club New Mills in July 2010. He retired from playing in 2012, having played regularly for New Mills up to the age of 41.

Honours
Walsall
Football League Second Division play-offs: 2001

Individual
York City Clubman of the Year: 1996–97

References

External links

1971 births
Living people
People from Billingham
Footballers from County Durham
English footballers
Association football defenders
Hartlepool United F.C. players
Stockport County F.C. players
Rotherham United F.C. players
York City F.C. players
Reading F.C. players
Walsall F.C. players
Plymouth Argyle F.C. players
Notts County F.C. players
Macclesfield Town F.C. players
Witton Albion F.C. players
FC Halifax Town players
Stalybridge Celtic F.C. players
New Mills A.F.C. players
English Football League players